Acácio Mora da Silva (born 2 January 1961 in Montalegre, Portugal) is a former Portuguese  professional road bicycle racer. He was a professional from 1982 to 1994 during which he won stages in the Tour de France, the Giro d'Italia and stages in many other stage races. He won three stages in total in the Tour de France, one in 1987, one in 1988 and one in 1989. After his stage win in 1989, he wore the yellow jersey as leader of the general classification for four days. In 1986 he won the Züri-Metzgete and was also Portuguese road champion.

Major results

1982
Tour de Kaistenberg
1983
Tour de Kaistenberg
Tour du Limousin
1984
Tour de Kaistenberg
Coppa Placci
1985
Coppa Ugo Agostoni
Giro d'Italia:
Winner stages 8B and 10
Giro dell'Emilia
1986
 National Road Race Championship
Züri-Metzgete
Giro d'Italia:
Winner stages 9 and 21
1987
Hegiberg-Rundfahrt
Schlossberg
Tour de France:
Winner stage 3
1988
Trofeo Luis Puig
Schynberg Rundfahrt Sulz
Tour de France:
Winner stage 4
1989
Giro d'Italia:
Winner stage 2
Tour de France:
Winner stage 1
GP Charly Gaul
1991
Elgg
1992
Elgg
Langenthal
1994
Fontanelas

References

External links

Acacio Mora Da Silva at Memoire-du-cyclisme.eu
Official Tour de France results for Acacio Da Silva

1961 births
Living people
Portuguese male cyclists
Portuguese Tour de France stage winners
Portuguese Giro d'Italia stage winners
Tour de Suisse stage winners
People from Montalegre
Sportspeople from Vila Real District